Momozono can refer to:
Emperor Momozono of Japan, 116th Emperor of Japan
Momozono Station, a station of the Kintetsu Nagoya Line, located in Hisai, Mie prefecture